Charles or Charlie Pollard may refer to:

 Charles Pollard (footballer) (born 1973), Guyana footballer
 Charlie Pollard (1897–1968), English rugby league footballer for Wakefield Trinity and Great Britain

See also
 Charles Pollard Olivier (1884–1975), American astronomer